Cheryl White may refer to:

 Cheryl White (singer), American country singer
 Cheryl White (jockey) (1953–2019), horse racing jockey and horse racing steward